The following is a timeline of the history of the city of Bologna, Emilia-Romagna region, Italy.

Prior to 18th century

 at least 1000 BCE - First settlement. 
 9th C. BCE - Etruscan settlement.
 end of the 5th century BCE - Celtic settlement.
 189 BCE - Town becomes a Roman colony.
 3rd C. CE - Catholic diocese of Bologna established.
 6th C. CE - Byzantines in power.
 9th C. CE - Benedictine monastery active in Santo Stefano.
 902 - Town sacked by Hungarian forces.
 1088 - University established.
 1109 - Torre Asinelli (tower) built.
 1110 - Torre Garisenda (tower) built.
 1112 - Bologna becomes a free town.
 1167 - City joins Lombard League.
 1184 - Bologna Cathedral consecrated by Pope Lucius III.
 1200 - Palazzo del Podestà built (approximate date).
 1206 - Inner city fortifications.
 1245 - Palatium Novum & Palazzo d'Accursio built.
 1249 - Enzio of Sardinia imprisoned in the Palatium Novum.
 1252 - Basilica of San Domenico dedicated.
 1263 - Church of San Francesco built.
 1293 - Paper mill established.
 1337 - Taddeo de Pepoli in power.
 1348 - Black Death epidemic.
 1351 - Giovanni Visconti of Milan in power.
 1356 - Public clock installed.
 1364 - Collegio di Spagna founded.
 1390 - San Petronio Basilica construction begins.
 1401 - Giovanni Bentivoglio in power.
 1436 -  founded.
 1438 - Bentivoglio family in power again.
 1444 - Clock tower built in the Palazzo Comunale.
 1471 - Printing press in operation.
 1477 - Ptolemy's illustrated Geography published.
 1506 - Bologna annexed to the Papal States from the Bentivoglio family.
 1511 - French in power.
 1530 - Coronation of Charles V, Holy Roman Emperor.
 1563 - Archiginnasio built.
 1567 - Fountain of Neptune installed.
 1568 - Orto Botanico (garden) established.
 1582
 Roman Catholic Archdiocese of Bologna established.
 Accademia dei Carracci (art school) founded.
 1603 - Palazzo Caprara built.
 1615 - Accademia dei Floridi founded.
 1642 - The gazette named Bologna was published for the first time
 1651 - Teatro Malvezzi built.
 1653 - Marcello Malpighi, biologist and physician, granted doctorates at University of Bologna.
 1666 - Accademia Filarmonica di Bologna founded.
 1675 - Birth of Prospero Lambertini, later Pope Benedict XIV.

18th-19th centuries
 1712 - Painting academy founded.
 1714
 Academy of Sciences of the Institute of Bologna established.
 Observatory built.
 1737 - Birth of Luigi Galvani a pioneer of bioelectromagnetics.
 1763 - Teatro Comunale built.
 1789 - Galvani conducts bioelectricity experiments.
 1796 - City becomes part of the French Cisalpine Republic.
 1801 - Biblioteca Comunale (library) opens.
 1805 - Teatro del Corso opens.
 1814
 City occupied by Austrians.
 Teatro Contavalli established.
 1831 - 4 February: "Insurrection."
 1833 - Young Italy Party unrest.
 1859 - June: "Insurrection."
 1860
 Bologna becomes part of the Kingdom of Italy.
 Gazzetta dell'Emilia newspaper begins publication.
 1871 - Population: 115,957.
 1874 - Archivio di Stato di Bologna (state archives) established.
 1897 - Population: 153,206.
 1899 - Avanti savoia! newspaper begins publication.

20th century

 1901 - Population: 102,122 town; 153,501 commune.
 1909
 5 February: Marinetti's Manifesto of Futurism published in Gazzetta dell'Emilia.
 Bologna F. C. 1909 football club founded.
 1914 - Maserati automaker in business.
 1926 - Cinema  opens.
 1944 - Aerial bombing.
 1945 - April: Battle of Bologna; Allied forces take city.
 1950 - Population: 226,771.
 1963 - Cineteca di Bologna founded.
 1974 -  headquartered in Bologna.
 1977 -  (student protest).
 1980 - 2 August: Train station bombing.
 1985 -  opens.

21st century

 2002 - Associazione Home Movies film archive founded.
 2003 - Sister city relationship established with Portland, Oregon, USA.
 2011 - Virginio Merola becomes mayor.
 2013 - Population: 380,635.
 2016 - May: Bologna municipal election, 2016 held.

See also
 Bologna history
 History of Bologna with timeline (in Italian)
 List of mayors of Bologna

Timelines of other cities in the macroregion of Northeast Italy:(it)
 Emilia-Romagna region: Timeline of Ferrara; Forlì; Modena; Parma; Piacenza; Ravenna; Reggio Emilia; Rimini
 Friuli-Venezia Giulia region: Timeline of Trieste
 Trentino-South Tyrol region: Timeline of Bolzano; Trento
 Veneto region: Timeline of Padua; Treviso; Venice; Verona; Vicenza

References

This article incorporates information from the Italian Wikipedia.

Bibliography

in English
 
 
 
 
 
 

 
 
 
 Grieco, Romy. Bologna: a city to discover(1976).

in other languages
 
 . (List of newspapers in Bologna)
 
 
 
 Brunella Dalla Casa and Alberto Preti, eds. Bologna in guerra, 1940-1945 (Milan: Angeli, 1995)
 Gastone Mazzanti. Obiettivo Bologna (Bologna: Costa, 2006 – 1st ed. 2001). (About World War II)
 G. Sassatelli, A. Donati, Storia di Bologna, Vol. 1 - Bologna nell'antichità, Bologna, Bononia University Press, 2005, .
 O. Capitani, Storia di Bologna, Vol. 2 - Bologna nel Medioevo, Bologna, Bononia University Press, 2007, .
 A. Prosperi, Storia di Bologna, Vol. 3 - Bologna nell'età moderna. Cultura, istituzioni culturali, Chiesa e vita religiosa, Bologna, Bononia University Press, 2009, .
 A. Berselli, A. Varni, Storia di Bologna, Vol. 4 - Bologna in età contemporanea. 1796–1914, Bologna, Bononia University Press, 2010, .

External links

 Europeana. Items related to Bologna, various dates.

History of Bologna
Bologna
Years in Italy